Westwood Middle School may refer to:

 Westwood Middle School in Inwood, Florida
 Westwood Middle School in Gainesville, Florida
 Westwood Regional Middle School in Westwood, New Jersey
 Westwood Middle School in Morgantown, West Virginia